Bahadurpura is a town and Union Council of Kasur District in the Punjab province of Pakistan. It is part of Kasur Tehsil, and is located at 31°3'49N 74°23'54E with an altitude of 185 metres (610 feet).

References

Kasur District